Wellington West was an electoral riding in Ontario, Canada. It was created in 1871 and was abolished in 1925 before the 1926 election.

Members of Provincial Parliament

References

Former provincial electoral districts of Ontario